Al-Tali'aa Taizz Sport Club, is a Yemeni football club based in Taiz, Yemen, that plays in Yemeni League.

Honours
Yemeni League:
 Runners up (1) : 1999–2000
Yemeni President Cup:
 Runners up (1) : 2012

References

External links
 Al-Tali'aa Taizz at globalsportsarchive

Al-Tali'aa Taizz
Al-Tali'aa Taizz
Association football clubs established in 1966